Bhagyada Bagilu is a 1968 Indian Kannada-language film, directed by K. S. L. Swamy (Ravi) and produced by B. H. Jayanna. The film stars Rajkumar, Balakrishna, Dwarakish , with K. S. Ashwath in a guest appearance. The film has musical score by Vijaya Bhaskar.

Cast

Rajkumar
Balakrishna
Dwarakish
K. S. Ashwath in Guest Appearance
Prasad in Guest Appearance
B. Vijayalakshmi
B. V. Radha
B. Jaya
M. Jayashree
Papamma
Mysore Srinivas
Srirangamurthy
Shastry
Venkatesh
Narayan
Raju
Venkataramaiah

Soundtrack
The music was composed by Vijaya Bhaskar.

References

External links
 
 

1968 films
1960s Kannada-language films
Films scored by Vijaya Bhaskar
Films directed by K. S. L. Swamy